Three naval vessels of Japan have been named Fusō:

 , an ironclad warship of the Imperial Japanese Navy that fought in the Battle of Yalu River.
 , lead ship of the Fusō-class.
 Japanese patrol boat Fusō, renamed from Mizuho in 2019 and lead ship of Mizuho-class patrol vessel.

Imperial Japanese Navy ship names
Japanese Navy ship names